İzzet Ünver (born 1 January 1992) is a Turkish volleyball player for Maliye Milli Piyango and the Turkish national team.

He participated at the 2017 Men's European Volleyball Championship.

References

1992 births
Living people
Turkish men's volleyball players
Volleyball players from Istanbul
Volleyball players at the 2015 European Games
European Games competitors for Turkey
21st-century Turkish people